The Silver Star was a luxury passenger train that ran overnight between Auckland and Wellington on the North Island Main Trunk (NIMT) railway of New Zealand, operated by New Zealand Railways (NZR). The train ran from Monday 6 September 1971 until Sunday 8 June 1979. It replaced the Night Limited express passenger trains which provided a faster service than the ordinary express trains, by stopping at only six intermediate stations (Palmerston North, Marton, Taumarunui, Taihape, Te Kuiti, Frankton) en route and not hauling a postal traffic as previous trains had.

Designed as a "hotel on wheels", the service was ultimately unsuccessful and attempts to re-use the rolling stock were thwarted by the presence of asbestos in the carriages. NZR eventually sold the carriages to the Eastern and Oriental Express, where they remain in use.

Introduction
The train was NZRs attempt to compete with the introduction of jet aircraft for business traffic between Auckland and Wellington. It was intended to improve the Railway's staff morale and image, and the concept was based on a shorter version of New South Wales Government Railways Southern Aurora, with its 75-foot, 20-berth sleeping carriages introduced in 1962, providing Pullman-style luxury equal to the last United States trains, the Broadway Limited, the San Francisco Chief, the Crescent and the Panama Limited. Planning for the new Auckland to Wellington overnight express began in 1963, and the concept of the train as 31 stainless steel carriages (two trainsets each night) of five "twinette" carriages, five single-berth sleepers (16 beds per car), a licensed buffet car and a power car, never changed.

The public announcement of plans for the new train was made in December 1965. Extensive study was made of other early 1960s Australian overnight trains, particularly the Queensland Rail Sunlander, the Victorian Railways/South Australian Railways The Overland, and similar designs in the United States, such as the final Santa Fe Railroad Hi-Level and Burlington Railroad carriages. New Zealand built carriages were estimated by NZR Chief Mechanical Engineer J. Black in 1958 to cost NZ£25,000 pounds for a second-class carriage and £35,000 for a first-class carriage.

By 1960, NZR had concluded that stainless steel carriages, which reduced maintenance costs, including avoiding the need to paint were preferable, even though this was at a cost premium of 12–20%. That meant in 1970 a per-carriage cost of $100,000+ for Japanese or Australian stainless steel construction, with $60,000 to $70,000 for conventional Italian or Swedish-built first-class carriages. In 1941 NZR built 31-seat first-class carriages at a cost of £7,140 and second-class, 56-seat carriages at a cost of £5,920 per carriage.

In 1967 the new train was promoted by the Minister of Railways, J.B. Gordon, on the grounds that it would deliver a clear return on its purchase cost and operation. Most equivalent overseas passenger rail services ceased that year and following the US Postal Service ending its use of almost all North American rail passenger services for first-class mail in September 1967—Santa Fe applied to the Interstate Commerce Commission to withdraw 33 out of 39 of the long-distance express passenger trains they ran. That is, all but the Los Angeles-Chicago Super Chief and its Frisco connection, the Texas Chief (Chicago-Houston), its Dallas connection, and two Los Angeles-San Diego locals. Approval for NZR to release tenders for the new train was made on 19 November 1968. The order for the train was placed with mid-1969 with Hitachi and Nippon Sharyo.

The Silver Star carriages were distinctive in New Zealand. Rather than being painted in the traditional red, carriages were made of unpainted stainless steel. Original planning for the train envisaged the sleeping carriages as the basis of new-standard NZR passenger stock with future passenger trains of six carriages and van, seven stainless steel units of 30 tons each (210 tons) hauled by a DA class locomotive. Planning for this replacement for the limited express became more ambitious in the early 1960s, moving away from 25-ton, 55-foot stainless steel carriages of the type used on the Queensland Rail Sunlander to sleeping carriages with a 9 ft 9 in loading gauge. As a result, the usual Silver Star consisted of 35-ton carriages that would weigh 410 tons and contribute to NZR's requirement for the DX class locomotives introduced from 1972 to haul the heavier carriages as well as express freight trains on the NIMT.

This required a large trackside work project on the NIMT and on the Silver Star's alternative route via the Stratford–Okahukura Line, to accommodate greater width carriages.

Withdrawal 
The Silver Star service broke new ground in New Zealand by providing a full onboard crew of car stewards (sourced from the inter-island rail ferry service) who doubled as dining car staff at mealtimes. A great deal of study had been made of on train meal provision, particularly of German and British Rail. The high wage and other industrial demands of the ferry stewards were one of the reasons the service failed. The product was effectively ten years too late. Travel by National Airways Corporation Boeing 737 between Auckland and Wellington took just over one hour; the Silver Star, by contrast, taking around 12 hours and 30 minutes, thus the business market was lost. Due to the freeze on rail fares and charges imposed by the Kirk Labour Government, which effectively meant the price from Wellington to Auckland was held at $18 from late 1971 to early 1976, use of the train was high in 1974-75 and 1975-76. In the late 1970s, the usual overnight patronage was only about 65 on most runs and only half the carriage stock was used for most of the year except during a few airline strikes.

In March 1979, the General Manager of NZR, Trevor Hayward, in his booklet Time for Change noted that the average subsidy per passenger on the Silver Star was $20.00, then a substantial amount of money. The service was withdrawn not long after on Sunday 10 June 1979.

Rolling Stock and motive power 

The 31 carriages were manufactured by Hitachi and Nippon Sharyo and hauled by diesel-electric locomotives (initially two DA class, and later one DX class) for a six-night-per-week service. All passengers were accommodated in sleeping cars, with 12 of these carriages being designated "Twinette" (8 x two-berth cabins incorporating separate bathrooms/showers for each cabin) and 12 being "Roomette" carriages (16 x single-berth cabins with toilet and basin facilities). Passengers could purchase dinner, breakfast and other refreshments during the night, including alcoholic beverages and souvenirs in the buffet car, of which three were built, with 42 alcove-style tables. Four power and baggage vans completed the fleet.

Bogies

All 31 carriages ran on bogies of a newer design, classed X28250 by NZR, which offered a superior quality ride through inertial dampers and better suspension, and bore a resemblance to the Kinki-Sharyo-manufactured bogies, classed X27250 by NZR, under steam and postal vans built by Kinki. The bogies built especially for the Northerner trains four years later and the FM-class guards vans two to six years after that, and classed X28280, were heavily modelled on those under the Silver Star.

Replacement

New Zealand Railways at the time also ran another overnight train service, (the Night Express) which stopped at more than twice the number of stations than the Silver Star did, which had much older rolling stock, and which had no onboard buffet service. It did have cheaper fares and three classes of accommodation. By refurbishing this train in 1975, to become the Northerner, many rail passengers had the option to pay around 33% less for a large reclining seat or 15% less for a 2-berth sleeper cabin without shower or toilet, than pay for a Silver Star cabin.

The Railways Department attempted to replace the Northerner and Silver Star with a refurbished version which would be a 50% seating and 50% sleeper train. This plan would include the redeployment of eight 30-seat carriages from the Northerner fleet to the Wellington-Napier Endeavour service, and relocation of the three 32-seat and three 36-seat Endeavour carriages onto the Christchurch-Picton route. These plans came to nothing after the Silver Star stock was withdrawn from service and blue asbestos insulation was found inside the coaches. The union workforce refused to work with the dangerous material, and the carriages lay parked in sidings for over ten years while their future was debated. In 1982, Minister of Railways, George Gair, facing a cost of $7 million for the asbestos removal and modernisation of the carriages, as well as rail losses and demand for other new rail equipment, commissioned Boston consultants, Booz Allen & Hamilton, to review NZR and in particular to investigate the most economical way of providing rail passenger options. The Ministry of Transport refused to accept NZR estimate that the rebuilt Silver Star would exceed the Northerner's patronage by 60% and operate profitably

The Railways then suggested that higher utilisation of the rebuilt Silver Star carriages would be achieved by using them on both night and day services on the NIMT allowing Silver Fern railcars, to be redeployed on other routes. In 1985 Minister of Railways, Richard Prebble delayed a decision, and—with the full expected cost of removing the blue asbestos and reconstructing the train having reached $20million—cancelled the conversion in line with the Booz Allen Report, which found modern railcar train-sets vastly more economical than small locomotive-hauled trains. By 1986, the NZR general manager considered the conversion of the Silver Star into a seating-only train as an uneconomical way of renewing the Northerner or Endeavour trains.

In December 1987, the Silver Star carriages were hauled from Wellington to Auckland, where private tourist firm Pacific Trailways intended to convert 27 of them into a luxury tourist train that would travel around both the North and South Islands for NZ$1,000 per passenger. Nothing eventuated and all the carriages languished in Auckland for two more years.

In 1990, the 31-car fleet was purchased by the British luxury travel company, Orient-Express Trains & Cruises (an off-shoot of Orient-Express Hotels) and taken to A & G Price, of Thames (New Zealand), for regauging from New Zealand's  gauge to  gauge for Thai and Malaysian railway lines. 24 carriages (19 sleepers, three buffet carriages and two power vans) went to Singapore where an extensive internal rebuild and fit-out, as well as exterior painting and badging, was undertaken by the new owners at their (then) newly-constructed maintenance depot on KTMB land in Singapore's Keppel Road rail yards. A 25th car also went to Singapore, and was stored unrefurbished for some years, but was scrapped when E&O moved its engineering workshop from Singapore to Johor. Since then the refurbished consist has operated a regular 5-star luxury cruise-train service between Singapore (now the Woodlands customs terminal on the island's northern coast) and Bangkok as the Eastern & Oriental Express.

Six carriages subsequently remained (still owned by Orient-Express) at A & G Price in Thames; two Twinettes, two Roomettes, and two power vans. They had had their interiors stripped, asbestos removed, and were no longer on bogies, and put up for sale from December 2012 until 2016. All six were sold to individual buyers.

References

Citations

Bibliography

External links
Silver Star (NZR Publicity poster)

Named passenger trains of New Zealand
Long-distance passenger trains in New Zealand
Railway services introduced in 1971
Railway services discontinued in 1979
1971 establishments in New Zealand
1979 disestablishments in New Zealand
Discontinued railway services in New Zealand